The hundred of Roborough  was the name of one of thirty two ancient administrative units of Devon, England. Roborough, Torridge, was within Fremington Hundred

The parishes in the hundred were:
 Bere Ferrers
 Bickleigh (near Plymouth)
 Buckland Monachorum
 East Stonehouse
 Egg Buckland
 Maker (in Cornwall from 1844)
 Meavy
 Pennycross
 Peter Tavy
 Plymouth: Charles the Martyr
 Plymouth: St Andrew
 Sampford Spiney
 Sheepstor
 St Budeaux
 Stoke Damerel
 Tamerton Foliot
 Walkhampton 
 Whitchurch.
 Woodtown

See also 
 List of hundreds of England and Wales - Devon
   Inspeximus: Poetry from the Manors of The Roborough Hundred by Ruth Snell   (2014) SilverWood Books Bristol

References 

History of Plymouth, Devon
Hundreds of Devon